Bernardo José Gandulla, better known as Bernardo Gandulla (March 1, 1916 – July 6, 1999) was an Argentine football forward and head coach. He died in Buenos Aires from respiratory problems.

Career

Playing career
Born in Buenos Aires, Bernardo Gandulla defended Ferro Carril Oeste from 1934 to 1939. He moved to Brazilian club Vasco in 1939, but played few games for the team. Gandulla returned to Argentina in 1940 to play for Boca Juniors. He played 57 Argentine Primera División games and scored 26 goals for the club, winning the competition in 1940 and 1943. He returned to Ferro Carril Oeste in 1944, leaving the club in 1946. Gandulla played for Atlanta from 1947 to 1948.

Coaching career
Gandulla was Defensores de Belgrano's head coach in 1953, winning the Primera División C in that season. He was Boca Juniors' head coach from 1957 to 1958.

Ball boy
He is well known in Brazil as his surname originated the term used in the country for the ball boy, which is gandula. Gandulla was part of Vasco's squad, but as he spent most of his time on the bench, he retrieved the balls during the games of his club.

Titles

Player
Boca Juniors
 Primera División: 1940, 1943

Head coach
Defensores de Belgrano
 Primera C: 1953

References

External links

1916 births
1999 deaths
Argentine footballers
Argentine people of Italian descent
Footballers from Buenos Aires
Association football forwards
Argentine expatriate footballers
Argentina international footballers
Argentine football managers
Ferro Carril Oeste footballers
CR Vasco da Gama players
Boca Juniors footballers
Club Atlético Atlanta footballers
Argentine Primera División players
Defensores de Belgrano managers
Boca Juniors managers
Expatriate footballers in Brazil
Burials at La Chacarita Cemetery